Events from the year 2016 in France.

Incumbents
 President – François Hollande (Socialist)
 Prime Minister – Manuel Valls (Socialist, until 6 December), Bernard Cazeneuve (Socialist, starting 6 December)

Events
1 January –
 9 regions of France are suppressed, from 27 to 18.
 Creation of the Métropole du Grand Paris.
 Inauguration of the Université Grenoble Alpes.
27 January – Jean-Jacques Urvoas is appointed to be Minister of Justice.
11 February – Former Prime Minister Jean-Marc Ayrault is appointed as Minister of Foreign Affairs and International Development.
26 February – 41st César Awards.
8 March – Laurent Fabius takes over as President of the Constitutional Council; Michel Pinault and Corinne Luquiens enter as simple members.
31 March – Nuit debout begins at the Place de la République, Paris.
 6 April – En Marche!, a liberal centrist political party, is founded by Emmanuel Macron in Amiens.
 20 May – Introduction of plain packaging for cigarettes and tobacco products.
 11 May – Beginning of the 2016 Cannes Film Festival.
 10 June – Opening of the UEFA Euro 2016 in 10 French cities.
 13 June – Magnanville stabbing.
 26 June – Referendum in the Loire-Atlantique department about the Aéroport du Grand Ouest; 55% of the voters accept the project.
 3 July – Opening of the LGV Est.
 14 July – Terrorist attack in Nice.
 24 July – The 2016 Tour de France ends in Paris.
 26 July – 2016 Normandy church attack.
 5 August –
 177 athletes from France begin to compete at the 2016 Summer Olympics in Rio de Janeiro, Brazil.
 The Braderie de Lille is cancelled due to terrorist threats.
 6 August – Thirteen people are killed in a fire in Rouen.
 8 August – The El Khomri law is signed by President Hollande.
 12 August – The mayor of Cannes bans the Islamic Burkini the swimsuits, citing a possible link to Islamic extremism. At least 20 other French towns, including Nice, subsequently joined the ban.
 30 August – Emmanuel Macron resigns from his position as Minister of the Economy.
 23 August – Laurent Wauquiez becomes president of The Republicans party ad interim.
 4 September – Notre Dame Cathedral bombing attempt.
 9 September – Opening of the fête de l'Humanité (3 days).
 1 October – Beginning of the 2016 Paris Motor Show.
 7 November – Yannick Jadot wins the Europe Ecology – The Greens primary and becomes the party's candidate for the 2017 French presidential election.
 13 November – A thousands of French people marks the first anniversary of last year attacks in Paris since World War II.
 27 November – Former Prime Minister François Fillon wins the right-wing primary for the 2017 French presidential election.
 1 December – President François Hollande announces he will not seek reelection in April 2017.
 6 December – Bernard Cazeneuve is appointed to be Prime Minister.
 19 December – The Law Court of the Republic founds IMF managing director Christine Lagarde guilty of negligence during her time as Minister of Finance.

General
Smartphone user penetration rate in France from 2018 to 2024. In 2024, the share of monthly active smartphone users is projected to reach 75.53 percent of the total population. This would be an increase of approximately six percent from 69.46 percent in 2018.

Deaths

January 
 1 JanuaryJacques Deny, mathematician (b. 1916)
 2 JanuaryMichel Delpech, singer-songwriter and actor (b. 1946)
 4 January
 André Turcat, aviator (b. 1921)
 Michel Galabru, actor (b. 1922)
 5 January
 Tancrède Melet, tightrope walker (b. 1983)
 Pierre Boulez, composer, conductor and writer (b. 1925)
 6 JanuaryYves Vincent, actor (b. 1921)
 7 JanuaryAndré Courrèges, fashion designer (b. 1923)
 15 JanuaryRobert Darène, film director and actor (b. 1914)
 18 January
 Michel Tournier, writer (b. 1924)
 Leila Alaoui, artist and photographer (b. 1982)
 20 JanuaryEdmonde Charles-Roux, writer (b. 1920)
 21 JanuaryRobert Sassone, road racing cyclist (b. 1978)
 23 JanuaryBernard Quennehen, road racing cyclist (b. 1930)
 28 JanuaryEmile Destombes, Roman Catholic bishop (b. 1935)
 29 JanuaryJacques Rivette, film director and film critic (b. 1928)
 31 JanuaryBenoît Violier, chef (b. 1971)

February 
 1 FebruaryBernard Piras, politician (b. 1942)
 7 FebruaryJuliette Benzoni, writer (b. 1920)
 8 FebruaryViolette Verdy, ballerina (b. 1933)
 17 FebruaryClaude Jeancolas, author (b. 1949)

March 
 1 MarchJean Miotte, abstract painter (b. 1926)

April 
 1 AprilAndré Villers, photographer (b. 1930)
 15 AprilAnne Grommerch, politician (b. 1970)

May 
 1 MayJean-Marie Girault, politician (b. 1926)
 5 MaySiné, political cartoonist (b. 1928)

July 
 1 JulyYves Bonnefoy, poet (b. 1923)
 2 JulyMichel Rocard, former Prime Minister (b. 1930)

See also
 List of French films of 2016
 2016 in French music
 2016 in French television

References

2010s in France